Waldo E. Koop (1920-1990) was a writer on the history of the American West, a researcher, and author of publications about Billy the Kid and "Rowdy Joe" Lowe.

Family

Waldo E. Koop was the son of John K. Koop and Katie Schmidt of Harvey County, Kansas.  His father was a store keeper for a railroad, and his mother operated a laundry at home.  He married Bette J. Young.

Career

As a career, Waldo E. Koop was an engineer for Boeing. He was called one of the nation's finest researchers by local and state historians, and was credited in the series of Time Life books on the Old West for his research on gunfighters. Koop discovered that Henry McCarty, later known as Billy the Kid, spent time in Wichita, Kansas, where he saw his first gunfight. He published his findings in 1965 in the book, Billy the Kid: the Trail of a Kansas Legend.

Publications

 Billy the Kid, The Trail of a Kansas Legend (Trail Guide), by Waldo E. Koop, 1965
 Rowdy Joe Lowe: Gambler With a Gun, by Joseph G. Rosa and Waldo E. Koop, Oct. 1989
 Book Review: ENCYCLOPEDIA OF WESTERN GUNFIGHTERS, The Journal of Arizona History, Vol. 20, No. 4, by Waldo E. Koop, 1979
 Waldo Koop Research Collection, by Waldo E. Koop, 1965-1990

References

External links
 Worldcat Overview & works, Waldo E. Koop
 Waldo Koop Research Collection at the Kansas Historical Society, Topeka, Kansas
 Waldo Emerson Koop at Ancestry.com

1920 births
1990 deaths
American engineers
People from Harvey County, Kansas
American historians